Mamadou Sylla (born 4 April 1975) is a retired Senegalese football defender.

Sylla was capped for Senegal and was a squad member for the 2000 African Cup of Nations. He played club football for AS Douanes at the time.

References

1975 births
Living people
Senegalese footballers
AS Douanes (Senegal) players
Senegal international footballers
2000 African Cup of Nations players
Association football defenders